The Basketball Bundesliga awards are the annual individual awards that are given by the top-tier level men's professional club basketball league in Germany, the Basketball Bundesliga.

Most Valuable Player

Finals MVP

All-Bundesliga Team

Coach of the Year

Best German Young Player

Best Offensive Player

Best Defender

Most Improved Player

Most Effective Player

Top Scorer

See also
 German Basketball League
 German Basketball League Champions
 German Basketball Cup
 German Basketball Supercup
 German League All-Star Game

References

External links
Official Site 
History of German Basketball 
History of the BBL (German) 

 
European basketball awards